The Indonesia men's national tennis team represents Indonesia in Davis Cup tennis competition and are governed by the Indonesian Tennis Association.

Indonesia currently compete in Group II of the Asia/Oceania Zone. They played in the World Group in 1983 and 1989.

Players

Current squad
Team representing Indonesia vs.  at 2022 Davis Cup World Group II Play-offs from 4-5 March 2022

Recent call-ups
The following players have been called up in the last three years. (Most recent call-up in brackets)
 David Agung Susanto (2020 Davis Cup World Group II)
 Justin Barki (2020 Davis Cup World Group II)
 Gunawan Trismuwantara (2020 Davis Cup World Group II)
 Ari Fahresi (2019 Davis Cup Asia/Oceania Zone Group II)

History
Indonesia competed in its first Davis Cup in 1961. Joseph Valentinus Sie, Liep Tjiauw Tan, Itjas Sumarno, and Sutarjo Sugiarto represented Indonesia in its first Davis Cup in 1961.

Results

See also
Davis Cup
Indonesia Billie Jean King Cup team

References

External links

Davis Cup teams
Davis Cup
Davis Cup
1961 establishments in Indonesia
Sports clubs established in 1961